Terellia plagiata is a species of tephritid or fruit flies in the genus Terellia of the family Tephritidae.

Distribution
United Kingdom, Norway, Sweden, North Russia, Germany, Switzerland, Hungary, Ukraine.

References

Tephritinae
Insects described in 1850
Diptera of Europe